The Industrial Investment Bank of India (IIBI) was a development finance institution under the ownership of Ministry of Finance, Government of India. It operated from its inception in 1971 until it was closed down by the Indian government in 2012.  It was a development finance institution with the aim of rehabilitating sick industrial companies in India.  IIBI offered a wide range of products and services, including term loan assistance for project finance, short duration non-project asset-backed financing, working capital/other short-term loans to companies, equity subscription, asset credit, equipment finance and investments in capital market and money market instruments.

History
It was established in 1971 by resolution of the Parliament of India u/s 617 of the Companies Act. The bank was headquartered at Kolkata and had presence in New Delhi, Mumbai, Chennai, Bengaluru, Ahmedabad and Guwahati.

The Industrial Reconstruction Corporation of India Ltd. (IRCI), set up in 1971 for rehabilitation of sick industrial companies, was reconstituted as Industrial Reconstruction Bank of India (IRBI) in 1985 under the IRBI Act, 1984. With a view to converting the institution into a full-fledged development financial institution, IRBI was incorporated under the Companies Act 1956, as Industrial Investment Bank of India Ltd. (IIBI) in March 1997.

The clientele of the bank included Videocon, Dr Morepen, Perfect Threads, Clutch Auto Limited, JSW Ispat  and LML Motors.

In 2005, a merger was considered of IIBI with the Industrial Development Bank of India and Industrial Finance Corporation of India, but IIBI refused. After the merger was refused by IIBI, the Indian government decided in 2006–2007 to close down the bank instead. As of 2011, the bank operated from its sole remaining office in Kolkata. Deloitte and Touche was appointed to dispose of IIBI's Non-Performing assets. The bank's closure was announced in the Budget 2012.

References

Financial services companies of India
Investment banks in India
1971 establishments in West Bengal
Indian companies established in 1971
Indian companies disestablished in 2012
Banks established in 1971
Banks disestablished in 2012